Alfredo Hurtado Abadía (known as Freddy Hurtado; born May 27, 1976 in Chocó) is a Colombian footballer who currently plays for Envigado.  He previously played with Cortuluá, Deportivo Pasto, Deportes Tolima and Deportivo Cali.

His professional debut with the club was on 9 July 1997 in Cali where they played against their main rivals, América de Cali.  Being a defender, he did not score any goals, but played the full 90 minutes, in a match which Deportivo Cali eventually won 2-0.

Honours

Deportivo Cali

League Titles:

1998
2005

2nd Place (League)

2006

Copa Libertadores:

1999 (runner-up)

Deportes Tolima

League Titles:

2003

Sources
deporcali.com

1976 births
Living people
Colombian footballers
Deportivo Cali footballers
Deportes Tolima footballers
Envigado F.C. players
Deportivo Pasto footballers
Cortuluá footballers
Categoría Primera A players

Association footballers not categorized by position
Sportspeople from Chocó Department